Mantab FC is a football club from St Kitts and is currently 9th in the St Kitts premier league.

References

Football clubs in Saint Kitts and Nevis